The Tomul River is a river in Madang Province, Papua New Guinea.

The Tomul River languages (Southern Adelbert languages) are spoken in the watershed.

See also
List of rivers of Papua New Guinea
Josephstaal Rural LLG

References

Rivers of Papua New Guinea